, also known by the Chinese-style name , was a prince of Ryukyu Kingdom. Sometimes he was called Prince Ie for short.

Prince Ie was the fifth son of King Shō Kō. He served as sessei from 1872 to 1875.

People of the Ryukyu Kingdom
1818 births
1896 deaths
Princes of Ryūkyū
Sessei
Ryukyuan people
19th-century Ryukyuan people
People of Meiji-period Japan
People from Okinawa Prefecture
Kazoku